Charles Fleming is an American author. In addition to writing multiple books on multiple subjects, fiction and non-fiction, he has also had a long career in print and TV journalism. As a staff writer for the Los Angeles Times he was the automobile and motorcycle reviewer and editor of the paper's Hollywood business section, Company Town. He has written extensively as a freelancer, for publications as varied as Vanity Fair, Entertainment Weekly, and TV Guide.

Background
Prior to joining the Los Angeles Times Fleming was a staff writer for the Los Angeles Herald-Examiner, Variety, and Newsweek and for many years served as an adjunct faculty member at the University of Southern California's Annenberg School of Journalism.

Among his published works are the best-selling High Concept: Don Simpson and the Hollywood Culture of Excess, and My Lobotomy, co-authored with the subject, Howard Dully. Fleming is also author of the popular Los Angeles-based urban walking guides, Secret Stairs and Secret Walks, and their Bay Area counterpart, Secret Stairs East Bay.

Born in North Carolina, and raised in Pacific Palisades, California, he is an Eagle Scout.

Published works

My Lobotomy

References

External links

University of Southern California faculty
Living people
Year of birth missing (living people)